This is a list of fiction and documentary films about or relating to the hippie counterculture of the 1960s.

Feature films

1960s 
The Acid Eaters (1968)
Alice in Acidland (1969)
Alice's Restaurant (1969)
The Big Cube (1969)
Blowup (1966)
The Born Losers (1967)
Candy (1968)
Chappaqua (1966)
Easy Rider (1969)
Eggshells (1969)
The Guru (1969)
The Happening (1967)
Head (1968)
How to Commit Marriage (1969)
I Love You, Alice B. Toklas (1968)
The Love-Ins (1967)
The Love Bug (1968)
Maryjane (1968)
Medium Cool (1969)
Midnight Cowboy (1969)
More (1969)
The Party (1968)
El Profesor Hippie (1969, Spanish)
Psych-Out (1968)
Riot on Sunset Strip (1967)
Skidoo (1968)
Three in the Attic (1968)
The Trip (1967)
What's New Pussycat? (1965)
Wild in the Streets (1968)
With Six You Get Eggroll (1968)
Wonderwall (1968)
Yellow Submarine (1968)

1970s 
200 Motels (1971)
An American Hippie in Israel a.k.a. Ha-Trempist (1972)
Beyond the Valley of the Dolls (1970)
Billy Jack:
Billy Jack (1971)
The Trial of Billy Jack (1974)
Billy Jack Goes to Washington (1977)
Breezy (1973)
Brother Sun, Sister Moon (1972)
Butterflies Are Free (1972)
Captain Milkshake (1970)
La Familia Hippie (1971, Spanish)
Fritz the Cat:
Fritz the Cat (1972)
The Nine Lives of Fritz the Cat (1974)
Gas-s-s-s (1971)
Ghetto Freaks a.k.a. Love Commune (1970)
Ginger in the Morning (1974)
Go Ask Alice (1973)
Godspell (1973)
Groupie Girl (1970)
Hair (1979)
Harold And Maude (1971)
Hare Rama Hare Krishna (1971, Hindi)
Helter Skelter (1976)
The Holy Mountain (1973)
I Drink Your Blood (1970)
Jesus Christ Superstar (1973)
Joe (1970)
Katherine (1975)
The Last Movie (1971)
La Vallée a.k.a. Obscured By Clouds (1972) Director:Barbet Schroeder
Love Story (1970)
The Magic Garden of Stanley Sweetheart (1970)
More American Graffiti (1979)
Performance (1970)
Punishment Park (1971)
The Psychedelic Priest a.k.a. Electric Shades of Grey (1971)
Rainbow Bridge (1972)
Shalom (1973, Hebrew)
The Song Remains the Same (1976) - features 1973 Led Zeppelin concert footage
The Strawberry Statement (1970)
Taking Off (1971)
Thumb Tripping (1972)
Two-Lane Blacktop (1971)
Up in Smoke (1978)
When You Comin' Back, Red Ryder? (1979)
Wild Honey (1972)
Woodstock (1970)
Zabriskie Point (1970)
Zachariah (1971)
Zardoz (1973)

1980s 
1969 (1988)
The Big Chill (1983)
Cheech & Chong:
Cheech & Chong's Next Movie (1980)
Nice Dreams (1981)
Things Are Tough All Over (1982)
Still Smokin' (1983)
Purple Haze (1982)
Rude Awakening (1989)
Where the Buffalo Roam (1980)

1990s 
The Big Lebowski (1998)
Dazed and Confused (1993)
The Doors (1991)
Far Out Man (1990)
Fear and Loathing in Las Vegas (1998)
Flashback (1990)
Forrest Gump (1994)
A Walk on the Moon (1999)
Hideous Kinky (1998)

2000s 
Across the Universe (2007)
Almost Famous (2000)
Born in 68 (2008)
The Dreamers (2003)
The Tripper (2006)
Humboldt County (2008)
I'm Not There (2007)
Into the Wild (2007)
The Manson Family (2003)
Stoned (2005)
The Grateful Undead (2007)
A Mighty Wind (2003)
The Rage in Placid Lake (2003)
Recess: School's Out (2001)
Steal This Movie! (2000)
Taking Woodstock (2009)
Youth in Revolt (2009)
Wood & Stock: Sexo, Orégano e Rock'n'Roll (2006, Brazilian)
Pineapple Express (2008)
Smiley Face (2007)
Das Wilde Leben a.k.a. Eight Miles High (2007, German)

2010s 
Happiness Runs (2010)
Hippie Hippie Shake (unreleased)
The House of the Sun (2010, Russian)
The Music Never Stopped (2011)
Our Idiot Brother (2011)
Wanderlust (2012)
Peace, Love & Misunderstanding (2012)
Something in the Air (2012)
Inherent Vice (2014)
Wild (2014)
Paradise Trips (2015)
Moonwalkers (2015)
Charlie (2015)
Captain Fantastic (2016)
The Glass Castle (2017)
Once Upon a Time in Hollywood (2019)

Documentary films
Back to the Garden, flower power comes full circle (2009), hippies in Washington state, U.S.
Berkeley in the Sixties (1990)
Beyond this Place (2010), imdb a man meets his absent hippie father for the first time
Charles Manson Superstar (1989)
The Cockettes (2002)
Commune (2005), about the Black Bear Ranch
Conventions: The Land Around Us (1968), at 1968 Democratic National Convention
Crumb (1994), about underground comix artist Robert Crumb
Dont Look Back (1967)
F.T.A. (1972)
Feast of Friends (1970) - The Doors' self-produced documentary filmed in 1968, released in 2014
Frisbee: The Life and Death of a Hippie Preacher (2005), about Lonnie Frisbee
Gonzo: The Life and Work of Dr. Hunter S. Thompson (2008)
Hippie Masala (2006), Swiss documentary about the hippies who live in India.
Hippie Movie (2008, Polish/English)
Huerfano Valley (2012, English), about a 40 years old hippie commune in Colorado. Three residents share their experiences and talk of the evolutions in the way of living in the commune during all these years.
The Hippie Revolt a.k.a. Something's Happening (1967)
Jimi Hendrix (1973), various interviews of people who knew Hendrix before and when he was famous
Jobs (2013)
Die Karawane der Blumenkinder (2008, German), documentary on the Hippie trail
Karl Hess: Toward Liberty (1980), documentary about Republican speechwriter turned anarchist
Klunkerz: A Film About Mountain Bikes (2006)
Last Hippie Standing (2002), on hippies in Goa with Cleo Odzer
'’Life and Times of the Red Dog Saloon, The'’ (1996)
Magic Trip (2011) Ken Kesey and the Merry Pranksters' bus adventures
Inside LSD (2009), an explorer puts LSD under the microscope
Manson (1973)
MC5: A True Testimonial (2002)
Mondo Mod (1967)
My Generation (2000)
My Hippies (2005) Reflection from two couples living in Haight Ashbury in the sixties.
Project Nim (2011), interviews and footage of the free and expressive upbringing of a chimpanzee taught sign language in the 1970s.
Ram Dass Fierce Grace (2001)
Revolution (1968)
Saint Misbehavin': The Wavy Gravy Movie (2008)
The Source Family (2012), the commune of the same name, first in Los Angeles, then Hawaii, centered around Father Yod.
Taylor Camp: Living the 60s Dream (2010), nostalgic reflections of 1970s hippies in tree houses in Hawaii.
Tripping (1999)
The Valley of the Moon (2010)
Underground (1976)
The U.S. vs. John Lennon (2006)
 Volem Rien Foutre al Païs (2006, French)
The Weather Underground (2002)
Within Reach Movie, journey to find sustainable community (2013)
Where Have All the Flowers Gone? (2008), a group of young people visit San Francisco

Concert films
The 14 Hour Technicolor Dream (2008), a documentary about the 1967 concert
Festival Express (2003)
Fillmore (1972)
Gimme Shelter (1970)
Glastonbury Fayre (1972)
Medicine Ball Caravan (1971)
Monterey Pop (1968)
Nambassa Festival (1980)
'’Rockin’ at the Red Dog: The Dawn of Psychedelic Rock'’ (2005)
Woodstock (1970)

Short films 
See external links section
"Brink of Disaster!" (1972)
"Curses and Sermons", documentary about poet Michael McClure
"Drug Abuse: The Chemical Tomb" (1969)
"Greenwich Village Sunday"
"Quantum Satori" (Samuel Vanclooster, 2015)

Television
The '60s (1999-2005)
All in the Family (1971-1979)
The Banana Splits (1968-1970)
Batman (1966-1968)
The Brady Bunch (1969-1974)
The Bugaloos (1970-1972)
Chico and the Man (1974-1978)
The Dick Cavett Show (1968-1975)
Dragnet 1967 (1967-1970) often portrayed hippies pejoratively
The Electric Company (1971-1985)
Family Ties (1982–1989)
Hippies (1999)
Hippy Gourmet (2001-)
H.R. Pufnstuf (1969-1971)
Kung Fu (1972-1974)
Lancelot Link, Secret Chimp (1970-1971)
Lidsville (1971-1973)
Love, American Style (1969-1974)
Mad Men (2007-2015)
The Mod Squad (1968-1973)
The Monkees (1966–1968)
Mulligan Stew (1972)
The Partridge Family (1970-1974)
Room 222 (1969-1974)
Rowan & Martin's Laugh-In (1968–1973)
The Smothers Brothers Comedy Hour (1967–1969)
The Sonny & Cher Comedy Hour (1971-1974)
Star Trek (1966-1969), hippie episode "The Way to Eden" first broadcast on 21 February 1969
Summerhill (2008)
WKRP in Cincinnati (1978-1982)
The Wonder Years (1988–1993)
The Young Ones (1982-1984)
The Drug Years (2006)

Animated
The Beatles (1965–1967)
Groovie Goolies (1970-1972)
Help!... It's the Hair Bear Bunch! (1971-1974)
The Magic Roundabout (1965-1977)
Scooby-Doo, Where Are You! (1969-1970) and Scooby-Doo successors to present

See also 
Hippie exploitation films
Acid Western

References

External links
List of counterculture films Based upon a deleted article from Wikipedia 

HippieTV, in Norwegian
Hippie Movies & TV Shows

Rainbow Family National Gathering 2006

Hippie subculture